The Bank Austria Open was a golf tournament on the Challenge Tour, played in July 1992–1994 at Donnerskirchen in Burgenland, Austria. The Bank Austria Open should not be confused with the 2008 edition of the Austrian Open on the European Tour, which was known as Bank Austria GolfOpen for sponsorship reasons. The final champion, as well as tournament record scorer, was a young Michael Campbell, winner of the 2005 U.S. Open.

Winners

References

External links
Coverage on the Challenge Tour's official site

Former Challenge Tour events
Golf tournaments in Austria
Sport in Burgenland